The 5th Expeditionary Force of the Ottoman Empire was one of the expeditionary forces of the Ottoman Army.

Order of battle
In December 1914, the 5th Expeditionary Force was structured as follows:

5th Expeditionary Force HQ (commander: Kaymakam Halil Bey)
7th Infantry Regiment (13th Division, Ankara)
9th Infantry Regiment (14th Division, Daday)
44th Infantry Regiment (15th Division, Yozgat)
3rd Battalion (Mountain Howitzer) (10th Artillery Regiment, Ankara)
10th Artillery Regiment

Sources

Expeditionary Forces of the Ottoman Empire
Military units and formations of the Ottoman Empire in World War I